Kiekie (Freycinetia banksii) is a densely branched, brittle, woody climber native to New Zealand. It is a member of the screwpalm family Pandanaceae.

Kiekie has numerous cane-like stems up to 40 mm in diameter, which freely produce aerial roots. It climbs tree trunks, or forms dense tangles on the forest floor. Its stems and leaves are a dominant feature in many areas of New Zealand forest, the stems eventually reaching up to 30 m long. The leaves are long and slender, 60–90 cm long and 2-2.5 cm broad.

Distribution
Kiekie is found in forests throughout the North Island. In the South Island, kiekie is more common in higher rainfall areas, reaching its southern limit near the Clarence river in the east and in Fiordland in the west.

Classification
In 1973, B.C. Stone argued that F. banksii should be regarded as a subspecies of F. baueriana of Norfolk Island (Stone 1973). Subsequent to this, de Lange et al. (2005:591-592), countered Stone's arguments and retained F. banksii as a distinct species because of significant differences from F. baueriana, including over all growth habit, phyllotaxis, leaf width, vein tessellation, and bract colour (salmon pink to orange in F. baueriana, white to purplish in F. banksii).

Uses
The sweet-tasting fruits and the succulent flower bracts (tāwhara) were a delicacy of the Māori. These were often gathered by using a forked stick. The leaves widely for plaiting and weaving, although the broader leaves of New Zealand flax were preferred because they provided more material. Kiekie was preferred for closely woven items, such as kete pūtea and kete pure. Items woven included mats and temporary baskets for holding food. The aerial roots were gathered to use as a binding material for implements and for making fish traps and sandals.

See also
Ieie, a related Hawaiian species

References

Freycinetia
Flora of New Zealand
Fiber plants